The 1991–92 United Counties League season was the 85th in the history of the United Counties League, a football competition in England.

Premier Division

The Premier Division featured 21 clubs which competed in the division last season, along with three new clubs:
Boston, joined from the Central Midlands League
Daventry Town, promoted from Division One
Spalding United, relegated from the Southern Football League

Also, Baker Perkins changed name to APV Peterborough City.

League table

Division One

Division One featured 17 clubs which competed in the division last season, along with one new club:
Burton Park Wanderers, relegated from the Premier Division

Also, British Timken Duston changed name to British Timken.

League table

References

External links
 United Counties League

1991–92 in English football leagues
United Counties League seasons